Israpafant (Y-24180)  is a drug which acts as a selective antagonist for the platelet-activating factor receptor, and was originally developed for the treatment of asthma. Its chemical structure is a thienotriazolodiazepine, closely related to the sedative benzodiazepine derivative etizolam. However israpafant binds far more tightly to the platelet-activating factor receptor, with an IC50 of 0.84nM for inhibiting PAF-induced human platelet aggregation (compared to etizolam's IC50 of 998nM at this target), while it binds only weakly to benzodiazepine receptors, with a Ki of 3680nM. Israpafant has been found to inhibit the activation of eosinophil cells, and consequently delays the development of immune responses. It has also been shown to have anti-nephrotoxic properties, and to mobilize calcium transport.

See also 
 JQ1

References 

Thienotriazolodiazepines